Allah Beygi (also Romanized as Allah Beygī) is a village in Itivand-e Jonubi Rural District, Kakavand District, Delfan County, Lorestan Province, Iran. As of the 2006 census, its population was 59, in 12 families.

References 

Towns and villages in Delfan County